Brookfield Central High School is a comprehensive public secondary school located in the city of Brookfield, Wisconsin, United States. About 1200 students attend every year. It is a sister school to Brookfield East High School, also in Brookfield. The high school is administered by the Elmbrook School District, which operates nine schools in Brookfield and Elm Grove.

Athletics 
BCHS won the 2019 boys' basketball state championship in 2019

BCHS won a state championship in boys' cross country in 1964.

Notable alumni 

Ayad Akhtar (1988), playwright and author
Steve Avery (1984), former NFL running back for the Pittsburgh Steelers
Susan Engeleiter (1970), Wisconsin politician and former Administrator of the United States Small Business Administration
Daron Hagen (1979), composer, stage director, author 
Kathleen Hogan (1984), Chief People Officer at Microsoft
John P. Otjen (1960), United States Army lieutenant general
Joe Thomas (2003), former NFL offensive tackle for the Cleveland Browns, NFL Hall of Famer 2023
Brad Nortman (2008), former NFL Punter for the Carolina Panthers and Jacksonville Jaguars
Kenny Harrison (1983), track and field athlete and Olympic gold medalist

References

External links
Official website

Public high schools in Wisconsin
Greater Metro Conference
Educational institutions established in 1956
Schools in Waukesha County, Wisconsin
1956 establishments in Wisconsin